Chaukune is a rural municipality located in Surkhet District of Karnali Province of Nepal.

Demographics
At the time of the 2011 Nepal census, Chaukune Rural Municipality had a population of 25,240. Of these, 82.4% spoke Nepali, 16.4% Magar, 0.7% Raji, 0.3% Maithili, 0.1% Gurung and 0.1% Bhojpuri as their first language.

In terms of ethnicity/caste, 28.9% were Chhetri, 25.2% Kami, 19.0% Magar, 14.6% Hill Brahmin, 6.2% Damai/Dholi, 2.1% Thakuri, 0.7% Raji, 0.7% Sanyasi/Dasnami, 0.6% Gurung and 2.0% others.

In terms of religion, 87.1% were Hindu, 12.4% Buddhist and 0.5% Christian.

References

External links
 Official website

Populated places in Surkhet District
Rural municipalities in Karnali Province
Rural municipalities of Nepal established in 2017